The Joplin School District is located in Jasper and Newton Counties in the City of Joplin, Missouri. It serves  more than 7,700 students in the school district.

Major Cities Served
Joplin, Missouri
Duenweg, Missouri
Webb City, Missouri (Partial)
Duquesne, Missouri

Recent history
On May 22, 2011, an EF5 tornado caused extensive damage to much of the city. Joplin High School, Franklin Technology Center, East Middle School, the old South Middle School, Irving Elementary, and Emerson Elementary were destroyed; Cecil Floyd Elementary, Duquesne Elementary, Eastmorland Elementary, and Kelsey Norman were damaged.

The district re-opened its Middle and Elementary schools on January 9, 2014; and Joplin High School and Franklin Technology Center re-opened in August 2014. The district had a long appeals process with the Federal Emergency Management Agency about adequate disaster funding years after all schools had reopened.

In March 2020, it was decided to close schools due to the COVID-19 pandemic until April 3. Later, the schools closed for the remainder of the year. On August 24, the schools reopened, with Joplin High School having a split schedule due to the number of students.

Schools

High school
Joplin High School
Franklin Technology Center

Middle schools
East Middle School
North Middle School
South Middle School

Elementary
Cecil Floyd 
Dover Hill (formed out of Columbia and West Central
Eastmorland
Irving
Jefferson
Kelsey Norman
McKinley
Royal Heights
Soaring Heights 
Stapleton

Former schools
Columbia (closed and consolidated with West Central due to aging and safety concerns) 
Duenweg (closed and consolidated in response to redistricting following the May 2011 tornado)
Duquesne (closed and consolidated in response to redistricting following the May 2011 tornado)
Emerson (damaged in May 2011 tornado, razed in December 2016)
Memorial (currently utilized as the district's administration offices. Formerly housed Joplin High School, Memorial High School)
Parkwood High School (consolidated into Joplin High School in 1985; building was destroyed in May 2011 tornado)
Washington Education Center (housed Irving Elementary after the tornado)
West Central (closed and consolidated with Columbia due to aging and safety concerns)

References

External links
Joplin School District

Education in Joplin, Missouri
School districts in Missouri